Khioniya Kuzminichna Guseva ( – after 1919) was a Russian townswoman (meshchanka) of Syzran. Starting in 1899 she lived in Tsaritsyn, now known as Volgograd. She became an adherent of the monk Iliodor until 1912. She attempted to kill Grigori Rasputin in 1914.

Biography
According to the records of the Extraordinary Investigative Commission of the Provisional Government (ru), Khioniya Guseva was a peasant of Syzran district uyezd of Simbirsk guberniya. 
The dates of Guseva's birth and death are unknown, but the police report indicates that she was 33 when she tried to assassinate Rasputin.
She was lacking a nose.

According to her own testimony, she never suffered from syphilis but was "damaged by medicines" since she was 13.

Assassination attempt on Rasputin
She attempted to assassinate Grigori Rasputin in his home village of Pokrovskoye, Tobolsk Governorate, where she arrived on 16 June 1914.  Some historians have dated the assassination attempt to 29 June 1914 (New Style)  or Monday 13 July.<ref>J.T. Fuhrmann (2013), The Untold Story, p. 119.</ref> According to historian Oleg Platonov, the assassination attempt was made on Sunday June 29 (Old Style).

Grigori Rasputin, a friend of the tsar Nicholas II of Russia and the Tsarina, was visiting his wife and children in his village, along the Tura River, in Siberia. On the afternoon of Sunday   having dined, he went out from the house. He had just received a telegram, and left his home to reply to it when he was attacked by Guseva, who drove a knife into his abdomen. Guseva purportedly screamed "I have killed the Antichrist!" after the attack. Still not dead, Rasputin was chased through the streets by Guseva in order to finish the task. He hit her in the face with a shaft, and a crowd quickly gathered, chanting "Let's kill her!" She turned herself over to the constable and was placed on trial. After seven weeks, Rasputin recovered. 

Guseva was found to be insane and was placed in an asylum in Tomsk until 15 March 1917. Then she was released on order of Alexander Kerensky. She is reported to have attempted and failed another assassination attempt, this time on Patriarch Tikhon of Moscow, in 1919. What happened to Guseva after 1919 is unknown and her date of death is also unknown.

References

People acquitted by reason of insanity

Sources
Joseph T. Fuhrmann, Rasputin: A Life(New York: Praeger, 1990).
Edvard Radzinsky, The Rasputin File'' (2000, Anchor, USA)  (paperback)

1914 crimes in the Russian Empire
Failed assassins
Assassins from the Russian Empire
Year of birth uncertain
Year of death missing
Grigori Rasputin